Tyrant of Red Gulch, also known as The Sorcerer, is a 1928 American silent Western film directed by Robert De Lacey and starring Tom Tyler, Frankie Darro and Josephine Borio.

It was made by Joseph Kennedy's FBO studio, soon to be merged into the much larger RKO organization.

Premise
A gang working on behalf of a foreign government use slave labor to exploit a secret mine.

Cast
 Tom Tyler as Tom Masters  
 Frankie Darro as 'Tip'  
 Josephine Borio as Mitza  
 Harry Woods as Ivan Petrovitch  
 Serge Temoff as Boris Kosloff  
 Barney Furey as Anton

References

Bibliography 
 Langman, Larry.  A Guide to Silent Westerns. Greenwood Publishing Group, 1992.

External links 
 

1928 Western (genre) films
Films directed by Robert De Lacey
1928 films
American black-and-white films
Film Booking Offices of America films
Silent American Western (genre) films
1920s English-language films
1920s American films